Sedliště may refer to places in the Czech Republic:

Sedliště (Frýdek-Místek District), a municipality and village in the Moravian-Silesian Region
Sedliště (Jičín District), a municipality and village in the Hradec Králové Region
Sedliště (Plzeň-South District), a municipality and village in the Plzeň Region
Sedliště (Svitavy District), a municipality and village in the Pardubice Region
Staré Sedliště, a municipality and village in the Plzeň Region